Axelrad is a surname. Notable people with the surname include:
Albert S. Axelrad (born 1938), American rabbi
Édouard Axelrad (1918–2006), French writer
John Axelrad, editor of films including We Own the Night
Nancy Axelrad, publisher and author of some of the Nancy Drew series of books
Penina Axelrad, American aerospace engineer
Vicki Lawrence (b. 1949), born Vicki Ann Axelrad, American actress, comedian, and singer
Ali Axelrad, born Alison Axelrad, American Actress and singer.

See also 
 Axelrod